Pettinengo is a comune (municipality) in the Province of Biella in the Italian region Piedmont, located about  northeast of Turin and about  southeast of Biella.

Pettinengo borders the following municipalities: Andorno Micca, Biella, Bioglio, Callabiana, Camandona, Piedicavallo, Pila, Piode, Rassa, Ronco Biellese, Scopello,  Tavigliano, Ternengo, Valle Mosso, Valle San Nicolao, Veglio, Zumaglia.

History 
From 1 January 2017 Pettinengo absorbed the neighbouring municipality of Selve Marcone.

Demographic evolution

References

Cities and towns in Piedmont